Newfoundland Drinking Songs is an album by Ryan's Fancy released in 1973.

Track listing
"Intro"
"The Night Paddy Murphy Died"
"Nancy Whiskey"
"Miss McLeod's Reel"
"The Northern Lights of Old Aberdeen"
"Rocky Road To Dublin"
"I'm A Rover"
"The Ryans & The Pittmans"
"Finnegan's Wake"
"Twenty One Years"
"Road to the Isles & The Beggerman"
"Butcher Boy"
"Fare Thee Well Enniskillen"

1973 albums
Ryan's Fancy albums